Rafael Barreto may refer to:

Rafael Barreto (footballer) (born 1986), Brazilian footballer
Rafael Barreto (singer) (born 1985), Brazilian singer